Cymbopetalum mayanum is a species of plant in family Annonaceae.  The specific epithet mayanum refers to the Mayan region in which it is indigenous, specifically the Atlantic lowlands of Guatemala and Honduras.  It grows as a tree.  It is endangered due to habitat loss from agriculture.

Common names for C. mayanum include Mayan cymbopetalum, huevo de toro, muk, anona de montaña, banana, chikinte, guanabano, guinellito, guineo, gunchuch, mata boni, mataboni, naguate, sufricaya, tulmax, chikinte, and naguate

Mayan cymbopetalum provides food for ants and many species of birds, including:

References

External links

mayanum
Flora of Guatemala
Flora of Honduras
Endangered flora of North America
Plants described in 1974